Lü Zheng (born 25 February 1985) is a retired Chinese professional footballer.

Club career
Lü Zheng started his football career with Shandong Luneng when he made his debut against Shenyang Ginde on 26 June 2004 in a 1-1 draw. This led to him making several further appearances during the season, which subsequently saw him play understudy to Li Jinyu and Han Peng as the team's main strikers. Often coming on as substitute, he would see the team win several league titles and cup trophies with the 2007 season being his most productive season playing as a forward. The following season saw Lü shift positions to right winger and he gradually saw himself gain more playing time as a result as well as a playing a considerably larger part in the team's next few seasons.

On 14 December 2014, Lü transferred to fellow Chinese Super League side Shanghai Shenhua. On 8 March 2015, he made his debut for the club in a 6-2 win against Shanghai Shenxin. He scored his first goal for Shanghai on 3 June 2015 in a 3-1 away defeat against Changchun Yatai.

On 28 February 2018, Lü transferred to China League One side Beijing Enterprises.

On 17 May 2020, Lü Zheng announced his retirement from professional football.

International career
Lü made his debut for the Chinese national team on 17 February 2008 in a 3-2 loss against South Korea.

Career statistics 
.

Honours

Club
Shandong Luneng
Chinese Super League: 2006, 2008, 2010
Chinese FA Cup: 2004, 2006, 2014
Chinese Super League Cup: 2004

Shanghai Shenhua
Chinese FA Cup: 2017

References

External links
Player Stats at football-lineups website

Player stats at sohu.com

1985 births
Living people
Chinese footballers
Footballers from Beijing
Shandong Taishan F.C. players
Shanghai Shenhua F.C. players
Beijing Sport University F.C. players
China League One players
Chinese Super League players
China international footballers
Association football wingers